Abraham van Strij (1753–1826) was an 18th-century painter from the Northern Netherlands.

Biography
Van Strij was born and died in Dordrecht.  According to the RKD he was the son of Leendert and the brother of Jacob. Both he and his brother were pupils of his father, and after taking lessons from Joris Ponse, Abraham joined his father's workshop. He was a member of the Dordrecht Guild of St. Luke and later its director. His son Abraham II also became a painter, and besides his son, he and his brother took on pupils after taking over their father's workshop. Their pupils were Pieter Rudolph Kleijn, Johannes van Lexmond, Jacob de Meijer, Johannes Rutten, Johannes Schoenmakers, Johannes Christiaan Schotel, and Gillis Smak Gregoor.

References

Abraham van Strij on Artnet

1753 births
1826 deaths
18th-century Dutch painters
18th-century Dutch male artists
Dutch male painters
Artists from Dordrecht
Painters from Dordrecht